Johann Baptist Schenk (30 November 1753 – 29 December 1836) was an Austrian composer and teacher.

Schenk was born in Wiener Neustadt. While still a boy he composed songs, dances and symphonies, and became a proficient violinist and keyboard and wind instrument player. In 1773 he went to Vienna to study with Georg Christoph Wagenseil. Beginning in 1777 he was composing religious works for Saint Stephen's Cathedral. In the 1780s he became a prolific composer of incidental music for plays and singspiele. His best-known singspiel is Der Dorfbarbier, which premiered in 1796. His other compositions include numerous cantatas, ten symphonies, several concertos (including a well-known one for harp), and five string quartets. Mozart was a good friend of Schenk and Beethoven studied under him in 1793.

In around 1823, he composed a variation on a waltz by Anton Diabelli (D 718), being one of the 51 composers who contributed to Vaterländischer Künstlerverein.

He died in Vienna.

Sources 
 John Kucaba/Bertil H. van Boer. The New Grove Dictionary of Opera, edited by Stanley Sadie (1992),  and

External links 
 

1753 births
1836 deaths
18th-century classical composers
18th-century Austrian male musicians
19th-century classical composers
18th-century Austrian people
19th-century Austrian people
Austrian classical composers
Austrian opera composers
Male opera composers
Composers for harp
People from Wiener Neustadt
Pupils of Georg Christoph Wagenseil
Austrian male classical composers
19th-century male musicians